Anthurium canaliculatum is a species of plant in the family Araceae. It is endemic to Ecuador.  Its natural habitat is subtropical or tropical moist montane forests.

References

Endemic flora of Ecuador
canaliculatum
Data deficient plants
Taxonomy articles created by Polbot